WCOD-FM (106.1 MHz) is a hot adult contemporary formatted radio station licensed to Hyannis, Massachusetts. It is owned by iHeartMedia, Inc. WCOD's sister stations include WEII, WCIB, and WXTK. Its transmitter and studio are located separately in Dennis.

History

One of the oldest FM signals on Cape Cod, WCOD was ranked third in the Winter 2008 Arbitron ratings .

106 WCOD was owned by Boch Broadcasting before moving to Quantum Communications in 2005. In 2009, CHR sister station WRZE became WEII, an all-sports station. Some of the staff, including morning anchors Dan and Stephanie, were moved over to WCOD. On March 16, 2009, the popular Dan and Stephanie morning show made its appearance on the station.

On May 15, 2014, Qantum Communications announced that it would sell its 29 stations, including WCOD-FM, to Clear Channel Communications (now iHeartMedia), in a transaction connected to Clear Channel's sale of WALK AM-FM in Patchogue, New York to Connoisseur Media via Quantum. The transaction was consummated on September 9, 2014.

References

External links

Barnstable, Massachusetts
COD-FM
Radio stations established in 1967
Hot adult contemporary radio stations in the United States
IHeartMedia radio stations